Gilberton, Queensland may refer to:
 Gilberton, Queensland (Etheridge Shire), Australia
 Gilberton, Queensland (Gold Coast), Australia